Stokes Mound Township is a township in Carroll County, in the U.S. state of Missouri.

Stokes Mound Township is named after an Indian mound of the same name.

References

Townships in Missouri
Townships in Carroll County, Missouri